Paragon was launched at Lancaster in 1801, or 1800. She traded across the Atlantic with the West Indies, South America, and North America. She captured one French vessel, and was herself captured, but swiftly recaptured by the Royal Navy. She was last listed in 1830, but with stale data from 1825.

Career
Paragon entered Lloyd's Register in 1801 with W. Hart, master, Ridley, owner, and trade London–Demerara. After the resumption of war with France, Captain William Hart acquired a letter of marque on 20 June 1803.

Lloyd's List reported on 12 August 1803 that Paragon, of Lancaster, Hart, master, while south of the Azores, had captured Harmonie. Harmonie had been sailing from New Orleans to Marseilles. Paragon sent her into Lancaster.

On 12 October 1804 Captain Paul Redmayne acquired a letter of marque. Captain William Hart acquired a letter of marque on 2 October 1805.

Lloyd's List reported on 10 June 1806 that Paragon had gone on shore at Berbice. She had then go into Demerara to unload, having lost her rudder.

On 4 August 1807 Captain Robert Millar acquired a letter of marque. This letter of marque gave Paragons burthen as 308 tons. Lloyd's Register for 1807 showed Paragons master changing from W. Hart to R. Millar, her owner from Ridley to Robinson, and her trade from London–Demerara to Greenock–Halifax, Nova Scotia. From Greenock she also sailed to New York City and to Demerara. In 1809 her master and owner changed to Forsyth.

Grand Turk was armed with 16 guns and had a crew of 130 men. An engagement ensued that lasted 17 minutes before the two British merchantmen struck. William had suffered two men killed and six men wounded.

 recaptured Paragon near Boston and Paragon arrived at Halifax on 2 June. William remained a prize and arrived at Salem on 30 May. A great wind struck Halifax on 12 November, sinking or damaging many ships. One of these was the "ship Paragon", which had been driven ashore, lost her mizzenmast, and had her upper works greatly damaged. Lloyd's Register for 1814 had the annotations "captured" by her name.

The Register of Shipping for 1815 showed Paragon with Stewart, master, Collins, owner, and trade London–Halifax. It also noted that she had undergone repairs in 1814.

On 21 August Paragon, Stuart, master, sailed from Portsmouth for Halifax. The transport Alexander arrived at Plymouth from Halifax on 25 October. Paragon was on her way to Halifax but had been dismasted and was "in great distress". Alexander rendered assistance and parted on 14 October. Paragon, Stewart, master, arrived at Halifax on 5 November, having come via Newfoundland.

On 23 July Friendship, Weeks, master, had to put into Exmouth with damage. Paragon, Smith, master, had run into her as Paragon was coming from America.

Paragon, Smith, master was entering Shields Harbour when she ran aground on the Herd Sand on 4 November 1821. She was later refloated and taken in to South Shields. She underwent a large repair in 1821.

Fate
Paragon was last listed in the Register of Shipping in 1825 with trade London coaster. She was last listed in Lloyd's Register in 1830 with trade London–Newcastle. Information in Lloyd's Register was stale, having shown no change relative to 1825.

Citations

1801 ships
Age of Sail merchant ships of England
Captured ships
Maritime incidents in 1813
Maritime incidents in 1820
Maritime incidents in November 1821